Meliki is a village and a former municipality in Imathia, Greece. Since the 2011 local government reform it is part of the municipality Alexandreia, of which it is a municipal unit. The municipal unit has an area of 98.962 km2. Population 7,104 (2011). Meliki is near Vergina, the place where the tomb of Philip II of Macedon was discovered.

External links
Official site of Meliki

References

Populated places in Imathia